The UCI men's road racing world rankings are a point system which is used to rank men's road cycling riders. Points are accrued over a rolling 52 weeks in three categories (Individual, Nations and Teams). 

Also Year-End rankings exist, based on 12-month period in both Individual and Nations categories. All points available are determined on the importance level and for its prestige at each race.

Current ranking system

UCI World Ranking 
On 10 January 2016, a complete new 52-week rolling basis ranking system was introduced in road cycling, incorporating both World Tour and Continental Circuit races.

Year-end previous ranking systems
Between 1948 and 2016 all rankings were Year-End, with no similarity to complete new 52 weeks system introduced in 2016:

Challenge Desgrange-Colombo (1948–1958) 
Year-end ranking included Giro, TdF, Vuelta, Milan–San Remo, Tour of Flanders, Paris–Roubaix, Liège–Bastogne–Liège, Lombardia, Paris–Tours, Paris–Brussels and Tour de Suisse.

Riders must have participated in at least one of the three races in each organizing country (Belgium, France and Italy) to appear in the top season rider final classification1.

Super Prestige Pernod (1959–1987) 
It was the Challenge Desgrange-Colombo successor ranking. It rewarded the season best rider who had been the most consistent in the biggest races (points were awarded over the entire cycling season).  

Ranking was divided into three categories: Super Prestige Pernod (the best rider of the year), Prestige Pernod (the best French rider) and Pernod Promotion (the best French under 25).

FICP/UCI Road World Rankings (1984–2004) 
Ranking was designating the best cyclist of the season. It was organized by Professional Cycling Federation (FICP) from the 1984 to 1992 and by Union Cycliste Internationale (UCI) from 1993 to 2004.

UCI Road World Cup (1989–2004) 
UCI Road World Cup system that operated from 1989-2004, was successor of Super Prestige Pernod. It consisted of ten one-day events, designating the best rider of the season.

UCI Pro Tour (2005–2010) 
UCI ProTour ranking (and the second-tier UCI Continental Circuits) was successor of UCI Road World Cup. It was a series of road bicycle races in Europe, Australia and Canada designating the best rider of the season.

The ProTour rankings were replaced with a World Ranking system for 2009-2010, though this only considered a small number of ProTour and other high-prestige races, and was then merged into the World Tour in 2011.

UCI World Tour (2011–2018) 
UCI World Tour ranking merged with ex UCI ProTour ranking in 2011. It was designating the best rider and the best team of the season between 2009 and 2018; and the best nation of the season between 2009 and 2016.

Current world rankings

Ranking timeline and statistics

List of number one ranked riders

last update: 14 March 2023

Total weeks at No. 1

List of number one ranked nations

last update: 14 March 2023

Year-end UCI World Rankings

The following is a list of Top 3 riders and nations at the end of each season:

Explanation of the ranking points system

UCI events

Points hierarchy for overall placings

Prologue and stage placing points hierarchy

Secondary classification (points and mountains competitions) hierarchy for final position

Wearing the race leaders jersey

Other events

Points for World, Olympic, Continental and National Championships

Team Time Trial Championships

Source:

References

External links
 Official UCI Rules

Ranking
Men's road cycling
Sports world rankings
Cycling records and statistics